INS Venduruthy is an Indian Navy base located on Willingdon Island in Kochi, Kerala. It serves as the Headquarters of the Southern Naval Command. It is the largest training establishment of the Indian Navy. INS Garuda is a naval air station located adjacent to INS Venduruthy. Commodore Deepak Kumar is the Commanding officer of this base. It provides administrative facilities to all training establishments inside the Southern naval command. Pincode of INS Vendurathy is 682004.

History
Willingdon Island was reclaimed from Kochi Lake to aid the construction of the Port of Kochi in 1936. A small naval unit was set up at the location just two days prior to the outbreak of World War II. During the war, the rudimentary air strip near the port was transferred to the Royal Air Force in 1941. On 22 June 1943, the facilities were transferred to the Royal Navy. With the ongoing war, the base quickly expanded to become the headquarters of the Royal Navy in southern India.

In 1946, after the end of the war, the base was deserted and transferred to the Royal Indian Navy which maintained a small establishment of about 20 officers and 130 enlisted men. The name of the establishment was changed from HMS Chinkara to HMIS Venduruthy after the name of the original Venduruthy island. On 26 January 1950, when India became a Republic, the name was changed to INS Venduruthy.

Following the partition of India, the navy lost three major training establishments which were located in the Dominion of Pakistan. INS Venduruthy was chosen as the location to replace these.

Facilities
INS Venduruthy currently hosts the Seamanship School, which imparts training to executive officers and sailors of the Indian Navy and several friendly foreign naval forces. The establishment caters to the logistic needs of the services, civilian personnel and naval units based in Kochi as well as at Ezhimala, Wellington, Bangalore and the Lakshadweep Islands besides the naval NCC units.

It also hosts the Diving School, Navigation & Direction (ND) School, Anti-submarine warfare (ASW) School, Signal School, Centre for Leadership and Behavioural Studies (CLABS) and NIETT.

See also
 Indian navy 
 List of Indian Navy bases
 List of active Indian Navy ships

 Integrated commands and units
 Armed Forces Special Operations Division
 Defence Cyber Agency
 Integrated Defence Staff
 Integrated Space Cell
 Indian Nuclear Command Authority
 Indian Armed Forces
 Special Forces of India

 Other lists
 Strategic Forces Command
 List of Indian Air Force stations
 List of Indian Navy bases
 India's overseas military bases

References 

Buildings and structures in Kochi
Venduruthy